Porte-du-Quercy (literally Gate of the Quercy) is a commune in the Lot department in southwestern France. It was established on 1 January 2019 by merger of the former communes of Le Boulvé (the seat), Fargues, Saint-Matré and Saux.

See also
Communes of the Lot department

References

Communes of Lot (department)
States and territories established in 2019